Siphonia is a genus of extinct hallirhoid demosponges of the Lower and Upper Cretaceous, from about 125 to 66 million years ago. They lived in the Western Tethys Ocean, in what is now Europe.

Description
They all had distinctive pear-shaped bodies that were attached to the seafloor via a long stem. Their common name, "tulip sponges," refers to their suggestive shape, while the genus name refers to how the spongocoel (the main tube of the sponge body) runs almost the entire length of the sponge, as though it were almost a drinking straw.

Gallery

References

 Parker, Steve. Dinosaurus: the complete guide to dinosaurs. Firefly Books Inc, 2003. Pg. 34

External links
Reconstruction of S. pyriformis 

Reconstruction of S. tulipa 

Reconstruction of S. tulipa, S. pyriformis, and the related Hallirhoa costata 

Fossil S. pyriformis 

Heteroscleromorpha
Prehistoric sponge genera
Late Cretaceous invertebrates
Early Cretaceous animals of Europe
Aptian genus first appearances
Albian genera
Cenomanian genera
Turonian genera
Coniacian genera
Santonian genera
Campanian genera
Maastrichtian genus extinctions
Fossil taxa described in 1826
Late Cretaceous animals of Europe
Early Cretaceous invertebrates